The 2018–19 Gonzaga Bulldogs men's basketball team (also informally referred to as the Zags) represented Gonzaga University, located in Spokane, Washington. in the 2018–19 NCAA Division I men's basketball season. The team was led by head coach Mark Few, in his 20th season as head coach. This was the Bulldogs' 15th season at the on-campus McCarthey Athletic Center and 39th season as a member of the West Coast Conference. They finished the season 33-4, 16-0 to finish in 1st place. In the WCC Tournament, they defeated Pepperdine in the semifinals before losing in the championship game to Saint Mary’s. They received an at-large bid to the NCAA Tournament where they defeated Fairleigh Dickinson, Baylor and Florida State to make the Elite Eight. In the Elite Eight, they lost to Texas Tech.

Previous season

The Bulldogs team finished the 2017–18 season 32–5, 17–1 in WCC play to win the WCC regular season championship. They defeated Loyola Marymount, San Francisco and BYU to become champions of the WCC tournament. They received the WCC's automatic bid to the NCAA tournament where they defeated UNC Greensboro and Ohio State to advance to the Sweet Sixteen where they lost to Florida State.

Offseason

Coaching changes

Additions to staff

Player departures

Incoming transfers

2018 recruiting class

Future recruits

Recruiting class of 2019

Recruiting class of 2020

Roster
 Roster is subject to change as/if players transfer or leave the program for other reasons.

Coaching staff

Schedule and results

|-
!colspan=12 style=| Exhibition

|-
!colspan=12 style=| Non-conference regular season

|-
!colspan=12 style=|  WCC Regular Season

|-
!colspan=12 style=| WCC Tournament

|-
!colspan=12 style=| NCAA tournament

Source

Rankings

*AP does not release post-NCAA Tournament rankings.^Coaches did not release a Week 2 poll.

References

Gonzaga Bulldogs men's basketball seasons
Gonzaga
Gonzaga Bulldogs men's basketball
Gonzaga Bulldogs men's basketball
Gonzaga